The Men's triple jump event at the 2002 European Athletics Championships was held at the Olympic Stadium on August 6 and August 8.

Medalists

Abbreviations
All results shown are in metres

Schedule

Records

Results

Qualification
Qualification: Qualifying Performance 16.80 (Q) or at least 12 best performers (q) advance to the final.

Final

External links
Results
Results

Men's triple jump
Triple jump at the European Athletics Championships